The Solomon and Henry Weil Houses are two historic homes located at Goldsboro, Wayne County, North Carolina.  They were built in 1875 for two brothers, and are nearly identical two-story, rectangular, Late Victorian frame dwellings.  They feature projecting bays, bay windows, porches, and verandahs. Social activist Gertrude Weil, Henry's daughter, grew up in the house at 200 W. Chestnut St.

They were listed on the National Register of Historic Places in 1976.

References

Goldsboro, North Carolina
Houses on the National Register of Historic Places in North Carolina
Victorian architecture in North Carolina
Houses completed in 1875
Houses in Wayne County, North Carolina
National Register of Historic Places in Wayne County, North Carolina